The following is a list of all IFT-licensed over-the-air television stations broadcasting in the Mexican state of Puebla. There are 17 television stations in Puebla.

Notably, there are no Televisa network transmitters legally licensed to Puebla. Televisa network service in the city of Puebla is provided from transmitters at Altzomoni, State of Mexico. Televisa's Tehuacán transmitters are repeaters of the stations at Huajuapan de León, Oaxaca.

List of television stations

|-

|-

|-

|-

|-

|-

|-

|-

|-

|-

|-

|-

|-

|-

|-

References

Television stations in Puebla
Puebla